The Hong Kah North Single Member Constituency is a single member constituency (SMC) in the western part of Singapore. The Member of Parliament for the constituency is People's Action Party (PAP) Amy Khor.

Town Council 
Hong Kah North SMC, along with Chua Chu Kang GRC, is managed by Chua Chu Kang Town Council.

Member of Parliament

Electoral results

Elections in 2010s

Elections in 2020s

References 

Singaporean electoral divisions
Bukit Batok
Tengah